is a Japanese punk rock band that formed in 2009.

Biography 

The band formed in December 2009, and was made up of students from Kwansei Gakuin University's music club in Nishinomiya. After finding it difficult to find full-time employment, the members decided to form the band. For three of the members, this was the fourth time they had formed a band. Seiya Yamasaki and Kazuma Okazawa were originally from a band called , which formed at Kwansei Gakuin University and was active in 2008 and 2009. Keyboardist Shinnosuke Yokota was originally from a band called Blank Map, and drummer Taisuke Sogō from a band called . The band took their name from an accessory from the game Final Fantasy X-2, which was translated as "cat nip" in the English version of the game. The name is a reference to the Japanese proverb .

In 2010, the band started performing at live houses across the Kansai area. In March 2012, the band released their first album Jūdai de Dashitakatta, followed by Daiji na Oshirase in December. The band entered the Rockin' On Japan web competition Ro69Jack 2011, and were one of 14 prize winning bands.

The band's 2013 extended play We Are Indies Band!! was successful, debuting in the top 20 of Oricon's albums charts. On April 1, 2014, it was announced that Kyuso Nekokami signed with major label Victor Entertainment, where they released Change the World in June.

The band has also toured in Asia.

Members 
 is the band's main vocalist and guitarist.
 is the band's keyboardist and occasional vocalist.
 is the band's guitarist.
 is the band's bassist, who joined the band on November 25, 2011 after Hagane-maru left.
 is the band's drummer.

Former member 
 is the band's former bassist, who left on November 25, 2011 to be replaced by Takurō Kawakubo.

Discography

Studio albums

Extended plays

Singles

Promotional singles

Video albums

Notes

References

External links 

 Official website
 Official Victor label site

2009 establishments in Japan
Japanese indie rock groups
Japanese punk rock groups
Musical groups established in 2009
Musical groups from Hyōgo Prefecture
Musical quintets
Victor Entertainment artists